Francisco José Urrutia Holguín (28 May 1910 – 19 October 1981) was a Colombian-Ecuadorian lawyer and diplomat. He served as the seventh Permanent Representative of Colombia to the United Nations, the 11th Colombia Ambassador to United States, and the Ambassador to Venezuela and Argentina.

Personal life
Francisco José Urrutia Holguín was born on 28 May 1910 in Quito, Ecuador to Francisco José Urrutia Olano, a Colombian diplomat who served as Minister of Foreign Affairs, and Minister Plenipotentiary of Colombia in Ecuador, and Elena Holguín Arboleda, Colombian activist who served as President of the Anti-Tuberculosis League of Colombia, and President of the Colombian Red Cross. He married Genoveva Montoya Williamson on 18 July 1934 in Bogotá, and together had five children: Francisco, María Lourdes, Jorge, Miguel, and Jaime.

References

1910 births
1981 deaths
People from Quito
Francisco Jose
Permanent Representatives of Colombia to the United Nations
Ambassadors of Colombia to the United States
Permanent Court of International Justice judges
Ambassadors of Colombia to Argentina
Ambassadors of Colombia to Venezuela
20th-century Colombian lawyers
Colombian judges of international courts and tribunals